Reading-Halls Station Bridge is a historic Howe pony truss railroad bridge located at Muncy Township, Lycoming County, Pennsylvania. It is the oldest bridge of its type still in operation in Pennsylvania.

It was added to the National Register of Historic Places in 1980.

It is likely that Richard B. Osborne, chief engineer for the railroad, designed and built the bridge.

See also
List of bridges documented by the Historic American Engineering Record in Pennsylvania

References

External links

Bridges completed in 1850
Bridges in Lycoming County, Pennsylvania
Historic American Engineering Record in Pennsylvania
Howe truss bridges in the United States
National Register of Historic Places in Lycoming County, Pennsylvania
Railroad bridges on the National Register of Historic Places in Pennsylvania